Matjaz Sekelj (born December 9, 1960 in Ljubljana, Yugoslavia) is a retired Slovenian professional ice hockey player.

Sekelj participated with HDD Olimpija Ljubljana in the Yugoslav Ice Hockey League for his entire career. He used to play for KHK Crvena Zvezda together with Jože Kovač. He participated with the Yugoslavia national ice hockey team at the 1984 Winter Olympics. He coached HDD Olimpija Ljubljana from 1997-2000.

References

1960 births
Living people
HDD Olimpija Ljubljana players
Ice hockey players at the 1984 Winter Olympics
Olympic ice hockey players of Yugoslavia
Slovenia men's national ice hockey team coaches
Slovenian ice hockey coaches
Slovenian ice hockey forwards
Sportspeople from Ljubljana
Yugoslav ice hockey forwards